is a Japanese light novel series written by Hideyuki Kurata, published under Shueisha's Super Dash Bunko imprint. Read or Die follows Yomiko Readman, codename "The Paper", an agent for the (fictional) Special Operations Division of the British Library. There are currently 11 Read or Die novels. In volume 11, a note stated that the series would end with the upcoming volume 12. In June 2016, it was announced via Twitter that volume 12 would be released in August, and that there would be a volume 13.

Along with the novels, Kurata scripted the official R.O.D manga illustrated by Shutaro Yamada, which was originally published in Ultra Jump magazine and later printed into four paperback volumes, and Read or Dream, a manga illustrated by Ran Ayanaga set in the same universe as Read or Die.

The popularity of the Read or Die novels and manga resulted in the production of an OVA adaptation in 2001, which was directed by Koji Masunari and produced by SME Visual Works. In 2003, Aniplex produced R.O.D the TV, a 26-episode animated television series, which served as a sequel to the OVA and introduced Read or Dreams characters to those from Read or Die.

On February 25, 2012, a new manga called R.O.D Rehabilitation started in the Super Dash & Go magazine, the story tells of a city created by Bibliomania, Bibliopolis.

On August 22, 2016, the twelfth light novel was announced, slated for release on August 26. The possibility of a new R.O.D anime was also hinted at in the announcement.

Plot
Read or Die takes place in an alternate history world where the British Empire has remained a major superpower.

The series follows Yomiko Readman, also known as "The Paper", a superhuman agent of the Library's Special Operations (possessing a "double 0" certification that denotes a "license to kill", as in the James Bond series, although she rarely invokes it). In both the novels and manga, her adventures alternate between doing missions for the British Library and helping young novelist Nenene Sumiregawa.

Only the first novel and first manga have similar stories, involving rescuing Nenene Sumiregawa from a vicious kidnapper. Otherwise, the novels, manga, and animated versions of the stories have divergent plotlines. While characterizations are usually consistent even when storylines are not, some characters have different origins in different versions of the story, or do not appear at all.

Characters

British Library
The British Library is an institution devoted to the promotion of literacy and the greater glory of the British Empire. More than a mere library, the British Library is a powerful political organization with branches all over the world.

The  is the secret enforcement branch of the British Library. Based in a giant underground complex concealed beneath the Great Court at the British Museum, the Special Operations Division employs a number of agents with special powers and runs operations all over the world to fight book-related crime and terrorism, and to acquire rare works for the Library. Their slogan is "Peace to the books of the world, an iron hammer to those who would abuse them, and glory and wisdom to the British Empire!"

 is a half-Japanese, half-English , an individual with the ability to control and influence paper. A substitute teacher in her spare time, she is the 19th British Library agent to earn the codename . Her name is a play on her nature as a bibliomania—the verb "to read" in Japanese is pronounced yomu.
{{nihongo4|Joker|ジョーカー|Jōkā}} is the acting head of the Special Operations Division. A stereotypical Englishmen, Joker's coolheadedness and silver tongue are his primary weapons. Though outwardly loyal and humble, Joker secretly wishes to be the actual head of the Division as it would allow him to gain control over the whole country.
 is a half-Indian, half-English girl. She joined the Special Operations Division at 19 years old, and soon became Joker's personal secretary. She is earnest and devoted, but clumsy and still an "in training" assistant.
 is the Special Operations Division's resident scientist, an aging man whose knowledge of paper is unrivaled. He developed the  Yomiko uses.
 is a 26-year-old agent; in the novels, Joker recruits her in China. Codenamed: , her special power is called: "Diving", which allows her to become intangible and pass through solid objects. Nancy does not appear in the manga, and has a different origin in the anime where she is one of two clones of Mata Hari.
 is a veteran of the American special forces, employed by the Special Operations Division as a field support operative mercenary for their agents. Drake is a hardened, no-nonsense soldier. Although he has no special powers, he is incredibly strong and possesses considerable combat experience. Anderson has a young daughter named Maggie, whom he cares for deeply (Maggie Anderson is not to be confused with Maggie Mui from Read or Dream). He is also kind-hearted and will not harm children, even if it goes against the mission.

Dokusensha

Supporting characters
 is a Japanese world-famous author. Her debut novel  was written when she was just 13. Nenene became acquainted with Yomiko when she worked briefly as a substitute teacher at Nenene's school. After Nenene is abducted by a crazy fan and subsequently rescued by Yomiko, the two become friends.
 is Yomiko's deceased mentor and lover. The agent known as "The Paper" before Yomiko, he died at her hands under mysterious circumstances, yet Yomiko recalls that she killed him with her power. She now wears his glasses in his memory, and believes that reading through them enables him to continue reading as well.
 is a prisoner of the British Library. Like Gentleman and China, he has lived for hundreds of years and, because of it, Gentleman trapped him to hide the secret.

Media

Light novels

Manga
The Read or Die manga series was written by Hideyuki Kurata, illustrated by Shutaro Yamada, and published in Shueisha's Ultra Jump from 2000 to 2005. It was later collected into four bound volumes by Shueisha and later licensed for translation and release in North America by Viz Media.

Volume list

OVA

Based on the Read or Die manga series, the film was directed by Koji Masunari and released in early 2001 in Japan by Studio Deen in early 2001 and outside Japan by Manga Entertainment in 2003. The story, featuring main characters such as Yomiko Readman and Joker, is a continuation of the Read or Die storyline, taking place a few years after the events of the manga.

AnimeR.O.D the TV is a 26-episode anime television sequel to the Read or Die OVA, animated by J.C.Staff and produced by Aniplex, directed by Koji Masunari and scripted by Hideyuki Kurata, about the adventures of three paper-manipulating sisters, Michelle, Maggie and Anita, who become the bodyguards of Nenene Sumiregawa. Its official title of R.O.D -THE TV- is a catch-all acronym referring to the inclusion of characters from both the Read or Die novels, manga and OVA and the Read or Dream'' manga, which revolves solely around the Paper Sisters.

References

External links
R.O.D.: Shueisha's information page on the novels.  

2000 Japanese novels
2000 manga
Light novels
Action anime and manga
Anime and manga based on light novels
Espionage in anime and manga
Super Dash Bunko
Seinen manga
Shueisha manga
Shueisha franchises
Thriller anime and manga
Viz Media manga